Narukhand (Devnagari : नरुखंड or नरूखंड) refers to the historical territories which remained under the possession of Naruka Rajputs. Literally, Narukhand means "the country of Naruka Rajputs".

It referred to aggregate of all the territories under the possession of descendants of Rao Naru, the eponymous founder of Naruka clan.

Centres of possessions historically held by Naruka Rajputs include- Alwar, Jawli, Lawa, Ladana, Uniara, Macheri, Jhak, Mozamabad etc.

The original region of Narukhand can be traced approximately as the region to the south (Mozamabad, Jhag, Lawa, Ladana, etc.), south-east (Uniara, Newai, Banheta, Kakod etc.) and north-west (Macheri, Rajgarh, Taur, Jawli, Garhi, Khudeena, etc.) to the former Amber kingdom (held by Rajawats). In north–south orientation it extends from Mozamabad to Malpura. The portions of Narukhand were included in former Alwar (or Ulwar) princley state also.

Rao Naru was the great-grandson of Raja Udaikarna of Amber. Grandfather of Rao Naru, Rao Bar Singh, was the eldest son of Raja Udaikarna and heir-apparent of the throne of Amber which he himself gave up and received Mozamabad in lieu. Mozamabad estate included towns of Jhak and Mozamabad and 84 villages.

References 

History of India
